Gomuşçu or Gomushchu or Gemyushchi or Gyumushchi may refer to:
Gomuşçu, Saatly, Azerbaijan
Gomuşçu, Sabirabad, Azerbaijan
Gomuşçu, Salyan, Azerbaijan